Waipara River may refer to the following New Zealand rivers:

 Waipara River (Canterbury)
 Waipara River (West Coast)